Leon Rattigan (born 4 October 1987) is a British freestyle wrestler who is in the Great Britain national squad. He started Freestyle Wrestling at the age of ten in Bristol Olympic Wrestling Club under the late legendary coach Amir Esmaeli. Rattigan has won the British Senior Championships and the English Senior Championships multiple times in his wrestling career. Rattigan competed in the 96 kg class in the 2009 world championship for GBR and also won the gold medal in the British Senior Championships 2009. Rattigan won the bronze medal for England in the men's freestyle 96 kg event at the 2010 Commonwealth Games in Delhi, India in October 2010. During 2011, Rattigan has also won the British Open wrestling championships and the Sassari International Tournament.

In 2013, Rattigan won the British Open wrestling championships and was selected to represent Great Britain at the FILA International Olympia Tournament where he secured a silver medal.
Leon Rattigan is also the head coach in WLWC where he is preparing young athletes for the upcoming competitions and giving people in the community a chance to enjoy the sport of Freestyle Wrestling.

References

British male sport wrestlers
Living people
Commonwealth Games bronze medallists for England
Black British sportspeople
1987 births
Sportspeople from Bristol
Wrestlers at the 2010 Commonwealth Games
Wrestlers at the 2014 Commonwealth Games
Commonwealth Games medallists in wrestling
Medallists at the 2010 Commonwealth Games
Medallists at the 2014 Commonwealth Games